Beinn a' Chleibh (Gaelic: Beinn a' Chlèibh) is a Scottish mountain. It is linked to Ben Lui by a short ridge.

References

 The Munros, Scottish Mountaineering Trust, 1986, Donald Bennett (Editor) 

Munros